Micky Allan (born 1944) is an Australian photographer and artist whose work covers paintings, drawings, engraved glass overlays, installations and photography. Allan has become an influential public speaker and has been invited to be a part of many discussions on feminist politics and present a number of speeches held in galleries across Australia about art photography during the 1970s.

Biography
Allan was born in Melbourne in 1944. From the age of two, she lived in Japan, before her family moved back to Melbourne in 1950. Allan attended the Melbourne Church of England Girls Grammar School, in South Yarra, where she received an American Field Service Scholarship allowing her to study in the U.S. Allan was heavily involved in painting as a teenager and attended a girls school in Kansas City in 1961. The school held Allan's first solo exhibition when her paintings were displayed in a national art contest.

After returning from Kansas, Allan studied Fine Arts at the University of Melbourne under Joseph Burke in 1963. She commenced a full-time Diploma of Painting course at the National Gallery of Victoria Painting School in 1965. However she felt it was impossible to make a living off art and only began taking photographs in 1974 after joining a feminist collective in Melbourne, and was taught how to process photos by housemate Virginia Coventry. She relocated to Sydney in the late 1970s, focusing on her own individual work as opposed to working on collective projects. Since then, Allan returned to painting as her primary medium in the early 1980s. She completed her studies for the Doctor of Philosophy, Painting, at the Australian National University of Arts in 2014.

Work
Before taking up photography, Micky Allan practiced painting. She produced a series of hand-coloured monochrome photographic prints in the mid 1970s, as did other Australian women artists. This is a technique that was used to 'colour' black-and-white portraits and wedding photos up to the 1970s before the availability of cheap C-type prints from logout negatives, and revived by artist-photographers in the early 2000s. Hand-colouring involved manually adding colour to a black-and-white photograph, through the materials and techniques of painting and the use of dyes. This extended the longevity of any existing colours in the image and personalized the work, and made the photograph a means of creative expression.

Allan's first handcoloured works were a series of her friend Laurel in 1975. The following year she worked on a series titled Babies which became an ongoing series concerned with life cycles. The photographs are portraits of babies with the face filling the frame and pencil colours in small areas. The work was displayed in the National Gallery of Australia. Allan's fascination with age cycles continued with her 1978 the series, Old Age. In close-up photographs of elderly people, Allan highlighted the physical ageing process which can be regarded as unattractive by society. Allan's work raised humanist concerns and the work has been displayed in many galleries across Australia.

Photography
Allan's career as a photographer includes commissioned projects around Australia. In 1974 she joined a feminist collective at Melbourne's experimental arts and theater space, the Pram Factory. She began working on sets, costumes and designing posters for the performances held there and then photographed the performances. Though it was not until her housemate Coventry had taught Allan how to take and print photographs later that year that she started to take photographs devotedly. From then on, Allan took photographs for magazines and began to emerge as a well-known female photographer. In 1974, The Pram Factory held her first show of black-and-white photographs.

My Trip
The series My Trip recorded Allan's 17-day road trip through rural Victoria, in 1975. In this publication she approaches people,  recording their conversations and portrays them in their natural state through photography. Allan decided to travel alone, recording photographically what she saw and experienced. Having finished a body of work in the darkroom, she felt she need to go on a holiday and decided to use her camera to arbitrate her interactions with the strangers that she came across. The series become a documentation of how women were perceived when travelling alone during the years of second-wave feminism.

Botany Bay Today
Allan's work in 1980 explored the juxtaposition of nature and the industrialization around Botany Bay. The black-and-white photographs consisted mainly of views near the bay, with some more general views of the area including hand-painted images of flowers, with an emphasis on the contrast between the industrial and natural world. The body of this work, exhibited at the NGV in 1980 by curator Jennie Boddington, focused on the industrial devastation of the coastline, raising awareness of the impact it has on daily life.

In 2010, Allan returned to Botany Bay with a partner, Steenus von Steensen, to find that not a lot had changed from her first visit in 1980, instead the area appeared more dire and grim than it had before. Botany Bay 2010 is a follow up to the 1980 series, but using  colour photography with some minimal colour painting. In 2010, Hazelhurst Regional Gallery and Arts Centre held the first exhibition of the series Botany Bay 2010, since which the series has been displayed at national galleries across Australia, alongside Allan's more recent work.

In 2022, Allan's work, Micky's Room, featured in Part One of the exhibition, "Know my name: Australian women artists 1900 to now" at the National Gallery of Australia.

Awards / prizes / residencies

| width="50%"  align=left valign="top" style="border:0"|
 1975 Special Project Grant, Visual Art /Craft Board, Australia Council for the Arts
 1979 Special Project Grant, Visual Art /Craft Board, Australia Council for the Arts
 1979 Artist-in-Residence, University of Sydney
 1982 Maude Vizard-Wholohan Prize, Art Gallery of South Australia(joint award)
 1983 Michael Karolyi Foundation, Vence, France
 1985 University of New South Wales Art Purchase Prize
 1985 Australia Council for the Arts Studio Cité internationale des arts in Paris
| width="50%" align=left valign="top" style="border:0"|
 1990 Artist Development Grant, Visual Arts/Crafts Board of the Australia Council
 1990 The Melbourne Savage Club Invitation Drawing Prize (joint award)
 1994 Artist-in-Residence, Canberra School of Art
 2003 Grant for New Work, Visual Arts/Crafts Board, Australia Council for the arts
 2006 Artist-in-Residence, Bundanon, NSW
 2007 Rosalie GascoingneAward, CAPO, Capital Arts Patrons Organisation, Canberra
 2010 Artist-in-residence (with Steenus von Steensen), Hazelhurst Regional Gallery, Sydney

Solo exhibitions
Allen's solo exhibitions include:
 1978 Photography, Drawing and Poetry, A Live-in Show, Ewing and George Paton Galleries, University of Melbourne, and Watters Gallery, Sydney
 1979 Landscapes and People on the Edges of Landscapes, Link Exhibitions, Art Gallery of South Australia
 1980 Travelogue, Watters Gallery, Sydney
 1980 Botany Bay Today, NGV, Melbourne and Australian Centre for Photography, Sydney
 1982 The Pavilion of Death, Dreams and Desire: The Family Room, Adelaide Festival of the Arts
 1984 Old Age (Project Show), Art Gallery of New South Wales, Sydney
 1985 Travels without my Aunt, 200 Gertude Street, Melbourne and Watters Gallery, Sydney
 1986 Recent Works, United Artists Gallery, Melbourne
 1987 Micky Allan Perspective, 1975-1987, (curator: Jenepher Duncan), Monash University Gallery
 1988 Places in Space, City Gallery, Melbourne
 1990 Harvest (with Aleks Danko), Watters Gallery, Sydney & Contemporary Art Centre, Adelaide
 1990 ACCA Experiments I: For Love of the Divine, Australian Centre for Contemporary Art, Melbourne
 1991 What is this Thing called Love? Deutscher Brunswick Street, Melbourne
 1992 Further Travels, Watters Gallery, Sydney
 1994 Gardens, Watters Gallery, Sydney
 2003 Parallel Worlds, Helen Maxwell Gallery, Canberra
 2005 Quietly, Infinity in the Everyday, Helen Maxwell Gallery, Canberra
 2008 Sunlight and Shadow, Helen Maxwell Gallery, Canberra
 2008 Inner Weather, Tin Sheds Gallery, Sydney
 2011 Spacious, Canberra Contemporary Art Space
 2013 Sea, ANU School of Arts Gallery, Canberra

References

External links
 Collection of works by Micky Allan (NGV)

1944 births
Living people
20th-century Australian photographers
Australian women artists
Photographers from Melbourne
People educated at Melbourne Girls Grammar
21st-century Australian photographers
University of Melbourne alumni